In the year 2010, there was a dramatic increase and prominence in the use of 3D-technology in filmmaking after the success of Avatar in the format, with releases such as Alice in Wonderland, Clash of the Titans, My Name is Khan, Jackass 3D, all animated films, with numerous other titles being released in 3D formats. 20th Century Fox celebrated its 75th anniversary in 2010.

Evaluation of the year
In his article highlighting the best movies of 2010, Richard Brody of The New Yorker said:
"At times it feels as if we’re living in something of a cinematic golden age, but one that’s altogether different from earlier halcyon days. Where some celebrate the former genius of the system to explain an earlier day’s proliferation of fine movies, now the system is something of a blunderer that often flings itself into follies or even crushes inspiration under its weight, but sometimes gets carried away, for reasons good or bad, and hands surprising control of vast resources over to artists who make stunningly audacious and personal use of them. The best filmmakers working in Hollywood have a passionate grasp of the cinematic past, but they don’t swoon over its polish or emulate its styles, they excavate it for its raw materials. There’s also a ferment here of independent filmmaking that liberates young people who, in earlier times, might have had to scuffle or supplicate for years while angling for a practical chance that now, with video, and with adequate effort, they can seize for themselves. Some of these independents have developed distinctive methods as well as aesthetics—regarding subject matter, picture, and performance—that are apt for the means of production. They make their lives, their homes, their families, their problems, and even their art the focus of their movies, and because, in their individuality, they share much with others in their generation, their stories, at their best—reflecting the age-old clashes and strivings of talented and ambitious youths in life, love, and art—reverberate deeply and widely. Meanwhile, the proliferation of arthouse cinemas and the sudden availability of classics on DVD and via Netflix go hand in hand with the rise of their art: their fierce focus on the immediate and the intimate includes the intensely personal experience of movies—whether treasures from the history of cinema or instant classics newly arrived from around the world. And, thanks to the Internet’s rapidity of ripple-effects that carry word from bloggers and enthusiasts to the world at large, the independent aesthetic and its artists have quickly had an impact on the Hollywood mainstream, in salutary ways."

Highest-grossing films

The top 10 films released in 2010 by worldwide gross are as follows:

Box office records
Toy Story 3 and Alice in Wonderland both grossed more than $1 billion, marking the first time that two films released in the same year grossed more than $1 billion at the box office. Both films were also released by the same studio, Walt Disney Pictures. 
Toy Story 3 was the first animated film to gross $1 billion, and is currently the seventh highest-grossing animated film ever worldwide. This is also the first time that five animated films have been present in the Top 10 highest-grossing films of the year; two of them are in the Top 5.
The year saw four films debut with more than $100 million, breaking the opening record of 2007 with three releases, and 2004 with two.

Events
January
17 – The 67th Golden Globe Awards winners were announced.
21 – The nominations of the 63rd BAFTA Awards were announced.
23 – The 16th Screen Actors Guild Awards winners were announced.

February
1 – The nominations of the 30th Golden Raspberry Awards were announced.
2 – The nominations of the 82nd Academy Awards were announced.
11 to 21 – The 60th Berlin International Film Festival was held.
21 – The 64th BAFTA Awards winners were announced

March
6 – The 30th Golden Raspberry Awards winners were announced.
7 – The 82nd Academy Awards winners were announced.
28 – The 15th Empire Awards winners were announced.

May
12 to 23 – The 63rd annual Cannes Film Festival was held.

June
6 – The 2010 MTV Movie Awards winners were announced.

July
22 to August 1 – The 10th Era New Horizons Film Festival was held.

September
1 to 11 – The 67th annual Venice Film Festival was held.
9 to 19 – The 35th annual Toronto Film Festival was held.

October
8 to 17 – The 26th Warsaw International Film Festival was held.
20 to 24 – The 1st American Film Festival was held in Wrocław.

November
26 to 28 – The 4th Dawn Breakers International Film Festival was held.
26 to December 5 – The 12th Jakarta International Film Festival was held.

December
4 – The 23rd European Film Awards was held.
11 – The 52nd Australian Film Institute Awards winners were announced.

Awards

2010 films 

The list of films released in 2010, arranged by country, are as follows:
 List of American films of 2010
 List of Argentine films of 2010
 List of Australian films of 2010
 List of British films of 2010
 List of Egyptian films of 2010
 List of French films of 2010
 List of Hong Kong films of 2010
 List of Italian films of 2010
 List of Indian films of 2010
 List of Assamese films
 List of Bengali films of 2010
 List of Bollywood films of 2010
 List of Gujarati films
 List of Kannada films of 2010
 List of Malayalam films of 2010
 List of Marathi films of 2010
 List of Odia films of 2010
 List of Punjabi films of 2010
 List of Tamil films of 2010
 List of Telugu films of 2010
 List of Tulu films
 List of Japanese films of 2010
 List of Lebanese films
 List of Mexican films of 2010
 List of Pakistani films of 2010
 List of Swedish films of the 2000s
 List of South Korean films of 2010
 List of Spanish films of 2010

Deaths

References

 
Film by year